Michel Reis (born 11 September 1982, in Luxembourg) is a Luxembourgian jazz pianist and composer who has performed internationally with a number of bands as well as solo.

Biography

Born in Luxembourg City, Reis began to play the piano when he was 8. When he started improvising and composing in his early teens, his father enrolled him in the jazz department at the Luxembourg Conservatory where he studied harmony, composition, improvisation and ensemble.

To further his musical training, Reis moved to Boston, MA to study at Berklee College of Music and the New England Conservatory of Music, obtaining first a BM and then a MM in jazz piano and composition. During his training in Boston, Reis studied, worked and performed with Joe Lovano, Danilo Perez, Dave Holland, George Garzone, Ran Blake, Frank Carlberg, Esperanza Spalding, Hal Crook and Greg Hopkins. In 2010, Reis participated in the ASCAP Foundation Workshop in Memory of Buddy Baker, led by film composers Bruce Broughton, Mark Snow, Ira Newborn and David Spear, with whom he has remained a part-time student.

Currently living between New York City and Luxembourg, Michel Reis has performed internationally in many of the world’s most famous venues and festivals, including the Blue Note Jazz Club, Dizzy’s Club Coca-Cola at Jazz at Lincoln Center, the Olympia in Paris, the Casa de Musica in Porto, the 55 Bar, the Knitting Factory, the Panama Jazz Festival the Montreux Jazz Festival, Cully Jazz, Crest Jazz Vocal, OctLoft Jazz Festival, Les Rendez-Vous de l’Erdre de Nantes and many more.

In 2005, Reis was a finalist in the First Moscow Competition for Jazz Performers. A year later, he took second prize at the Montreux Jazz Solo Piano Competition.

Awards

2005: Finalist, First Moscow Competition for Jazz Performers (Piano)
2006: Second prize, Montreux Jazz Competition
2013: Export Artist of the Year award with Reis Demuth Wiltgen Trio by the Luxembourgish export office music:LX
2014: Export Artist of the Year award by the Luxembourgish export of office music:LX

Discography as a Leader

"A Young Mind", WPR Records (2006)
"Fairytale", WPR Records (2009)
"Point of No Return", Armored Records (2010)
"Hidden Meaning", Double Moon Records (2012)
"Capturing This Moment", Double Moon Reocords (2015)
"Mito", Cortez Sound / Mocloud Records (2018)
"Japan Quartet", Mocloud Records (2018)
"Short Stories", CAM Jazz (2019)

Discography with Reis Demuth Wiltgen

"Reis-Demuth-Wiltgen", Laborie Jazz (2013)
"Places In Between", Double Moon Records (2016)
"Once In a Blue Moon", CAM Jazz (2018)
"Sly", CAM Jazz (2021)

References

External links 
Homepage

Luxembourgian jazz pianists
1982 births
Living people
People from Luxembourg City
Luxembourgian jazz musicians
Luxembourgian composers
21st-century pianists